Aptinoma antongil is a species of ant in the subfamily Dolichoderinae. The species is  known only from Antongil Bay, Madagascar.

References

External links

Dolichoderinae
Insects described in 2009
Hymenoptera of Africa